Tzofei Tel Aviv (or Tel Aviv Scouts in English) is a musical group originating from Israel.  The performers are teenagers, picked out of the Israel Scouts in Tel-Aviv, Israel. They tour around the world, performing mostly Hebrew songs for Jewish organizations and others the world over. For example, they performed Yom Ha'atzmaut concerts in Lima and Guayaquil in June 2003, as they did in St. Louis Park, MN, in 2006. The group's musical director is Moishele Yosef, who has various other jobs in the musical profession.

References

Israeli musical groups